Nic Marais (born 6 June 1980) is a former South African radio personality.  Marais hosted Kfm Breakfast from January 2002 to June 2008.  His remains the most listened-to breakfast show in Cape Town's history with 1.3 million weekly listeners. During his time on radio, he conducted numerous high-profile interviews with local and international politicians and celebrities. These included Nobel Prize laureates Nelson Mandela, Desmond Tutu and F.W. de Klerk, and movie stars Charlize Theron and Morgan Freeman.

He is a member of the Yale Law School class of 2011. In 2011, he took top honors in the final round of the Thomas Swan Barristers' Union Mock Trial Competition at Yale Law School; he was awarded the John Fletcher Caskey Prize for best presentation of a case on final trial.

Marais now resides in San Francisco, California United States. He is an attorney at the law firm, Keker, Van Nest & Peters, a litigation boutique.

Notes

External links
 
 
 Official presenter profile
 94.5 Kfm homepage
 Kfm Breakfast

1980 births
Living people
South African radio presenters
People from Cape Town